Andalusia Express (Italian:Il mondo sarà nostro, Spanish:El expreso de Andalucía) is a 1956 Italian-Spanish drama film directed by Francisco Rovira Beleta and starring Jorge Mistral, Marisa de Leza and Mara Berni.

Synopsis 
A former retired athlete, a law student and a petty criminal come together to plan and perpetrate the theft of some jewelry transported in the Andalusian express mail van.

Cast
 Jorge Mistral as Jorge Andrade  
 Marisa de Leza as Lola  
 Mara Berni as Silvia Ríos  
 Vicente Parra as Miguel Hernández  
 Ignazio Balsamo as Rubio  
 Carlos Casaravilla as Carlos Salinas  
 Antonio Casas as Inspector  
 Natale Cirino 
 Franco Sineri 
 Flora Marrone   
 José Calvo as Arturo  
 Ricardo Turia 
 Marcelino Ornat
 José Castro 
 Marcela Yurfa 
 Manuel Aroca 
 Salvador Soler Marí 
 María del Carmen Morales 
 José Ramón Giner as Cliente de las gafas  
 José Luis López Vázquez as Pretendiente de Lola  
 Piero Signorelli 
 Saro Spadaro
 Michele Abruzzo 
 Manuel Aguilera as Empleado de casa de empeños  
 Juan Cazalilla as Camarero del hotel 
 Goyo Lebrero as Empleado de Correos  
 Ángel Álvarez as Apostador en frontón

References

Bibliography 
 Mira, Alberto. Historical Dictionary of Spanish Cinema. Scarecrow Press, 2010.

External links 
 

1956 films
1956 drama films
Spanish drama films
Italian drama films
1950s Italian-language films
1950s Spanish-language films
Films directed by Francisco Rovira Beleta
1950s multilingual films
Italian multilingual films
Spanish multilingual films
1950s Spanish films
1950s Italian films
Italian black-and-white films
Spanish black-and-white films